Holopsis is a genus of minute hooded beetles in the family Corylophidae. There are about 9 described species in Holopsis.

Species
 Holopsis carolinae (Casey, 1900)
 Holopsis convexa (Casey, 1900)
 Holopsis flavoocellus (Blatchley, 1927)
 Holopsis impunctatus (Casey, 1900)
 Holopsis marginicollis (LeConte, 1852)
 Holopsis sphaericula (Casey, 1900)
 Holopsis subtropicus (Casey, 1900)
 Holopsis suturalis (Sharp in Blackburn and Sharp, 1885)
 Holopsis virginica (Casey, 1900)

References

 Bowestead, Stanley, and Richard A. B. Leschen / Arnett, R.H. Jr., et al., eds. (2002). "Family 94. Corylophidae LeConte 1852". American Beetles, vol. 2: Polyphaga: Scarabaeoidea through Curculionoidea, 390–394.
 Slipinski, Adam, Wioletta Tomaszewska, and John F. Lawrence (2009). "Phylogeny and classification of Corylophidae (Coleoptera: Cucujoidea) with descriptions of new genera and larvae". Systematic Entomology, vol. 34, no. 3, 409–433.

Further reading

 Arnett, R. H. Jr., M. C. Thomas, P. E. Skelley and J. H. Frank. (eds.). (21 June 2002). American Beetles, Volume II: Polyphaga: Scarabaeoidea through Curculionoidea. CRC Press LLC, Boca Raton, Florida .
 Arnett, Ross H. (2000). American Insects: A Handbook of the Insects of America North of Mexico. CRC Press.
 Richard E. White. (1983). Peterson Field Guides: Beetles. Houghton Mifflin Company.

External links

 NCBI Taxonomy Browser, Holopsis

Corylophidae
Coccinelloidea genera